Giovanni Pastrone, also known by his artistic name Piero Fosco (13 September 1883 – 27 June 1959), was an Italian film pioneer, director, screenwriter, actor and technician.

Pastrone was born in Montechiaro d'Asti. He worked during the era of the silent film and influenced many important directors in the international cinema with Cabiria, such as David Wark Griffith, in his The Birth of a Nation (1915) and Intolerance (1916).

Martin Scorsese believes that Pastrone's work in Cabiria can be considered as the invention of the epic movie and he deserves credit for many of the innovations often attributed to D.W. Griffith and Cecil B. DeMille. Among those was the extensive use of a moving camera, thus freeing the feature-length narrative film from "static gaze".

He died in Turin on 27 June 1959.

Complete filmography

Directing 
 La glu (1908)
 Giordano Bruno eroe di Valmy (1908)
 Julius Caesar (1909)
 The Fall of Troy (1911)
 Stronger than Sherlock Holmes (1913)
 Cabiria (1914)
 Tigre reale (1916)
 The Fire (The Fire, 1916)
 Maciste alpino (The Warrior, 1916)
 La guerra e il sogno di Momi (1917)
 Maciste the Athlete (1918)
 Hedda Gabler (1920)
 Povere bimbe (1923)

Acting 
 Julius Caesar (1909)

References

External links 
 
 Giovanni Pastrone in Epdlp (Spanish)

1883 births
1959 deaths
Italian male actors
Italian film directors
20th-century Italian screenwriters
Italian male screenwriters
Film people from Turin
People from Montechiaro d'Asti
Actors from Turin
20th-century Italian male writers